Worringen is a Stadtteil (quarter) of the city of Cologne, Germany. Situated 15 km north of the city centre, on the left bank of the Rhine, it is part of the district of Chorweiler. In 1288, it was the site of the Battle of Worringen. It is served by the Köln-Worringen station.

References

Chorweiler
Boroughs and quarters of Cologne